Datah Dian is a village in North Putussibau district, Kapuas Hulu Regency in West Kalimantan province, Indonesia. Its population is 856.

Climate
Datah Dian has a tropical rainforest climate (Af) with heavy to very heavy rainfall year-round.

References

 Populated places in West Kalimantan